Isla de Cabras (Spanish for goat island) is an islet located at the entrance of the San Juan Bay in Puerto Rico. It is part of the Palo Seco barrio of the municipality of Toa Baja.

Isla de Cabras is the current location of:
 Fortín San Juan de la Cruz, also known as El Cañuelo.
 A recently opened recreational park.
 A local police firing range.

Island has been a place of many uses during its history.

History

Spanish Fortification

Due to its strategic location at the entrance of San Juan Bay, Isla de Cabras provided a strategic point for an effective crossfire with Fort San Felipe del Morro to prevent incoming ships from entering. It also provided defenses for the entrance of the Bayamón River on the other side of the islet.

Leper Colony

At the end of the 19th century, a leper colony was established on the island. On December 17, 1876, the governor of Puerto Rico, Segundo de la Portilla, set the first stone of the official building to house lepers, which was completed in 1883. However, it is believed that the colony was established prior to construction of the building.

Upon the occupation of Puerto Rico by American troops in 1898, management of the building was handed over to the government of the island. According to the 1910 US Census, there were 35 people living on the island at that time.

In 1926, a leper asylum was built on the main island (Trujillo Alto) next to a church, and the residents of the colony were moved there. However, the original building still stands on Isla de Cabras.

American Fortification
In the 1940s, the United States built Fort Amezquita (named for Juan de Amézqueta), a few hundred feet from El Cañuelo. The fort was initially called the "Cabras Island Military Reservation". During World War II this fort served as a "concrete gun battery" for the US Army Coast Artillery Corps. In November 1940 the US Army transferred the barrels of three 12-inch coastal guns from Fort Delaware, Delaware; two of these guns were mounted in the fort as Battery Reed with the third as a spare. They were on long-range M1917 barbette carriages and protected by concrete casemates.

Shooting Range & Recreational Park
In recent years, the grounds that belonged to Fort Amezquita were converted into a shooting range and training area by the P.R.P.D. Ownership of the remaining acres of land were under legal dispute, until they were finally transferred to the Department of Sports and Recreation and opened to the public as the Isla de Cabras Recreational Park, which is equipped with several gazebos and includes a beach for swimming and fishing.

Gallery
Places and views of Isla de Cabras:

See also

 El Cañuelo

References

External links
 The Bio-political History of Isla de Cabras Leper Colony and the Problematics of the Memorialization of Suffering by Adriana María Garriga López, Columbia University

Leper colonies
Cabras, Isla de
Toa Baja, Puerto Rico
Tourist attractions in Puerto Rico
Medical and health organizations based in Puerto Rico